Archiserratula is a genus of flowering plants belonging to the family Asteraceae.

Its native range is Southern Central China.

Species:

Archiserratula forrestii

References

Asteraceae
Asteraceae genera